Velďáková is a surname. Notable people with the surname include:

Dana Velďáková (born 1981), Slovak triple jumper
Jana Velďáková (born 1981), Slovak long jumper, twin sister of Dana

Slovak-language surnames